Chester William Strumillo (May 28, 1924 – July 27, 2010) was an American professional basketball player. He appeared in one game for the Chicago American Gears in the National Basketball League during the 1944–45 season.

In college, Strumillo attended the University of Illinois and played on their freshman basketball team in 1940–41, but was then drafted into the Army to fight in World War II. Upon returning he resumed his collegiate basketball play for Northwestern University's varsity team between 1946 and 1949.

References

1924 births
2010 deaths
United States Army personnel of World War II
American men's basketball players
Basketball players from Chicago
Chicago American Gears players
Forwards (basketball)
Northwestern Wildcats men's basketball players
People from Cicero, Illinois
University of Illinois Urbana-Champaign alumni